Midland Metals Overseas Pte Ltd v The Christchurch Press Co Ltd [2002] 2 NZLR 289 is a cited case in New Zealand regarding owing a duty of care in negligence.

References

Court of Appeal of New Zealand cases
New Zealand tort case law
2002 in case law
2002 in New Zealand law